The Granite Mountains is a small mountain range in the Southeast Fairbanks Census Area of the U.S. state of Alaska.

References

Mountain ranges of Alaska
Landforms of Southeast Fairbanks Census Area, Alaska